San Pedro de Atacama is a Chilean town and commune in El Loa Province, Antofagasta Region. It is located east of Antofagasta, some 106 km (60 mi) southeast of Calama and the Chuquicamata copper mine, overlooking the Licancabur volcano.  It features a significant archeological museum, the R. P. Gustavo Le Paige Archaeological Museum, with a large collection of relics and artifacts from the region. Native ruins nearby attract increasing numbers of tourists interested in learning about pre-Columbian cultures.

History
San Pedro de Atacama grew, over centuries, around an oasis in the Puna de Atacama, an arid high plateau. Its first inhabitants were the Atacameños, who developed basketworks and ceramic pottery crafts that can be now be appreciated by tourists in the several souvenir shops as typical products of San Pedro de Atacama.

It was part of Bolivia since independence from Spain until Chile claimed ownership during the War of the Pacific. During that war, the Battle of Río Grande was fought in the surroundings.

Demographics
According to the 2002 census of the National Statistics Institute, San Pedro de Atacama had 4,969 inhabitants (2,928 males and 2,041 females). Of these, 1,938 (39%) lived in urban areas and 3,031 (61%) in rural areas. The population grew by 75.6% (2,140 persons) between the 1992 and 2002 censuses.

Administration
As a commune, San Pedro de Atacama is a third-level administrative division of Chile administered by a municipal council, headed by an alcalde who is directly elected every four years. The 2008-2012 alcalde is Sandra Berna Martínez.

Within the electoral divisions of Chile, San Pedro de Atacama is represented in the Chamber of Deputies by Marcos Espinosa (PRSD) and Felipe Ward (UDI) as part of the third electoral district, (together with Tocopilla, María Elena, Calama and Ollagüe). The commune is represented in the Senate by Alejandro Guillier Álvarez (PRSD) and Pedro Araya Guerrero (Ind.) as part of the second senatorial constituency (Antofagasta Region).

Climate

Transportation
San Pedro lies on the main paved road from Argentina over the Paso de Jama, 160 km from the town.  The road is paved throughout. There are frequent bus services to Calama, several buses daily to Santiago and buses on 6 days a week to Salta across the Andes in Argentina. Nearby airports are San Pedro de Atacama Airport and Salar de Atacama Airport for private aircraft, and the larger El Loa Airport/Calama 100 km away for scheduled aircraft.

Tourism
San Pedro de Atacama is a popular tourist destination. There are various activities for adventurers in the San Pedro de Atacama area: trekking, climbing, archaeological sightings, amateur astronomy, exploration tours in natural landscapes and even sand boarding in the desert. Because of its altitude, a brief period of acclimatization may be required.

Sights in town
In the town are some cultural and scientific sites:
R. P. Gustavo Le Paige Archaeological Museum, displaying ceramics and pottery crafts from the first inhabitants of the area.
Church of San Pedro de Atacama a National Monument, built with adobe, a building material used in the colonial times.
Meteorite Museum displays and explains meteorites of various compositions, from various celestial sources, some of which an international collaboration has gathered in the large, infrequently disturbed collection area of the Atacama.

Outlying sights
Chaxas Lagoon, part of Los Flamencos National Reserve in the Salar de Atacama, inhabited by pink flamingos.
El Tatio, a geyser field with over 80 active geysers.
Llano de Chajnantor Observatory, a radio-telescope site, home of "ALMA", the Atacama Large Millimeter Array.
Laguna Miscanti (Miscanti Lagoon) and Laguna Miñiques (Miñiques Lagoon), two neighboring altiplanic lagoons at the altitude of 4,200 m (13,500 ft).
Licancabur, a notable volcano near San Pedro de Atacama.
Pukará de Quitor (Fort Quitor). A fortification built by the Atacameño people in the 12th century.
Puritama Hot Springs
Salar de Atacama, a giant salt area (3,000 km2 / 1,864.11 mi2) in the middle of the Atacama Desert.
Valle de la Luna ("Valley of the Moon"), a moon-like landscape with ruins of old Chilean salt mines, and worker huts.
Valle de la Muerte (Death Valley): a valley where gigantic dunes and rocks abound.

Holidays and festivals in San Pedro de Atacama
The festivals includes typical dances, masses in the street and a little parade through the main street of San Pedro de Atacama.
June 28 - Saint Peter
June 29 - Saint Paul
Feb   2 - Virgin de la Candelaria

Image gallery

See also
Atacama Desert
Puna de Atacama
Eduardo Abaroa
List of towns in Chile
Monturaqui crater

References

External links

Best things to do in San Pedro de Atacama

 San Pedro de Atacama Tours and Activities

Pictures and Wallpapers of Atacama Region
Tourism: Tours in San Pedro de Atacama
San Pedro de Atacama's Travel Assistance
San Pedro de Atacama's Facebook Page
San Pedro de Atacama's commune
R. P. Gustavo Le Paige Archeological Museum
San Pedro de Atacama Tourism
Tradiciones de Atacama
San Pedro de Atacama weather forecasts, compared (Google translations available).

Communes of Chile
Oases of Chile
Atacama Desert
Populated places in El Loa Province
Archaeological sites in Chile